Orders and decorations conferred to personnel of the Singapore Police Force, Singapore Civil Defence Force and Singapore Armed Forces in Singapore.

Each force has different orders and medals for their personnel.

Singapore Police Force

Singapore Civil Defence Force

Singapore Armed Forces

Singapore Police Force
Military awards and decorations of Singapore
Conscription in Singapore